Yunguyo District is one of seven districts of the province Yunguyo in Peru.

Ethnic groups 
The people in the district are mainly indigenous citizens of Aymara descent. Aymara is the language which the majority of the population (62.50%) learnt to speak in childhood, 36.53% of the residents started speaking using the Spanish language (2007 Peru Census).

See also 
 Asiru Phat'jata
 Qhapiya

References